This is a list of Georgia Tech Yellow Jackets football players in the NFL Draft.

Key

Selections

See also
List of Georgia Institute of Technology alumni

Notes

References

Georgia Tech

Georgia Tech Yellow Jackets NFL Draft